Luiz Alberto da Silva Oliveira (born 1 December 1977 in Rio de Janeiro), more commonly Luiz Alberto, is a Brazilian former football defender who last played for Boavista.

Career
Luiz Alberto was 16 years old when he first played for Flamengo but it was only in 1997 when he clinched a place in the club's first eleven. He played alongside the likes of Júnior Baiano and Juan in a partnership that led the club to Campeonato Carioca and Copa Mercosur titles in 1999. In 2000, however, he lost his place in the starting eleven for new signing Carlos Gamarra and was transferred to Saint-Étienne.

After one season with the French team, he moved to Real Sociedad in Spain, where he played first between 2001 and 2002 and also from 2004 to 2005. Between his stints at Spanish club, Luiz Alberto also played for Internacional and Atlético Mineiro.

Luiz Alberto came back to Brazil in 2005 after signing for Santos, later returning to Rio de Janeiro in 2007 to play for Fluminense in where he has won 2007 Copa do Brasil and finished runner-up at 2008 Copa Libertadores after losing the final to LDU Quito on penalties.

In 2010, after leaving Fluminense, Luiz Alberto joined Argentine club Boca Juniors. On 20 April 2010 Boca Juniors released the Brazilian central defender by mutual consent.

International career

Alberto has had one international appearance for Brazil under Vanderlei Luxemburgo in a 1999 FIFA Confederations Cup match against New Zealand on 30 July 1999.

Honours

Club
Flamengo
Gold Cup: 1996
Rio de Janeiro State League: 1996, 1999, 2001
Brazilian World Champions Championship: 1997
Mercosur Cup: 1999
Guanabara Cup: 1999

Santos
São Paulo State League: 2006

Fluminense
Brazilian Cup: 2007

References

External links

Guardian Stats Centre
CBF 

1977 births
Living people
Footballers from Rio de Janeiro (city)
Brazilian footballers
Brazil international footballers
CR Flamengo footballers
1999 FIFA Confederations Cup players
Brazilian expatriate footballers
Expatriate footballers in France
Ligue 1 players
AS Saint-Étienne players
Expatriate footballers in Spain
La Liga players
Real Sociedad footballers
Campeonato Brasileiro Série A players
Campeonato Brasileiro Série B players
Sport Club Internacional players
Clube Atlético Mineiro players
Santos FC players
Fluminense FC players
Club Athletico Paranaense players
Clube Náutico Capibaribe players
Duque de Caxias Futebol Clube players
Expatriate footballers in Argentina
Brazilian expatriate sportspeople in Argentina
Boca Juniors footballers
Argentine Primera División players
Association football defenders